Data processing machine may refer to:

Component or equipment used as part of a Data processing system
Accounting machine
Tabulating machine
Computer, in certain legal contexts 

Data processing